Kolosovo is a rural locality (a village) in Vakhromeyevskoye Rural Settlement, Kameshkovsky District, Vladimir Oblast, Russia. The population was 47 as of 2010.

Geography 
Kolosovo is located 19 km north of Kameshkovo (the district's administrative centre) by road. Vakhromeyevo is the nearest rural locality.

References 

Rural localities in Kameshkovsky District